60 metres hurdles is a distance in hurdling which is generally run in indoor competitions. It is equivalent with the first 5 hurdles of a standard outdoor hurdle race. The current women's and men's world records are 7.68 seconds (Susanna Kallur) and 7.29 seconds (Grant Holloway), respectively.

Area records
Updated February 2021.

All-time top 25
Indoor results only

Men
Updated March 2023.

Women
Updated March 2023.

World Indoor Championships medalists

Men

Medal table

Women 

 Known as the World Indoor Games

Medal table

Season's bests

Men

Women

Notes

References

External links
IAAF all-time best, men's
IAAF all-time best, women's
IAAF list of 60-metres-hurdles records in XML
IAAF record holders

Events in track and field
Hurdling
Indoor track and field
Sprint hurdles